Bazargah may refer to:
 Bazargah, Gilan (بازارگاه - Bāzārgāh)
 Bazargah, Isfahan (بازارگاه - Bāzārgāh)
 Bazargah, Khuzestan (بازارگه - Bāzārgah)
 Bazargah, Qazvin (بازرگاه - Bāzargāh)